Jerry Edward Wisne (born July 28, 1976) is a former American football offensive tackle. He spent five seasons in the National Football League, playing for four different teams: Chicago Bears (–), Minnesota Vikings, St. Louis Rams, and Green Bay Packers (2002–).

Wisne was a High School All-American by USA Today in 1994, and played his college football at the University of Notre Dame.

1976 births
Living people
People from Rochester, Michigan
American football offensive tackles
Notre Dame Fighting Irish football players
Chicago Bears players
Minnesota Vikings players
St. Louis Rams players
Green Bay Packers players